Charles or Charlie Parker may refer to:

Politicians and administrators
Charles D. Parker (1827–1925), former Lieutenant Governor of Wisconsin
Charles H. Parker (1814–1890), Wisconsin legislator
Charles Parker (Australian politician) (1896–1956), New South Wales politician
Charles Parker (British politician), activist in the British National Party
Charles Parker (New Zealand politician) (1809–1898), New Zealand politician and carpenter
Charles Parker (Michigan politician) (1877–1934), member of the Michigan House of Representatives
Charlie Parker (Nova Scotia politician) (born 1951), NDP MLA for Pictou West in Nova Scotia, Canada
Charles Stuart Parker (1829–1909), British Member of Parliament for Perth, 1878–1892
Charles William Parker (1912–1997), clergyman and politician in British Columbia, Canada

Sportsmen
Charlie Parker (basketball) (born 1948), American basketball coach
Charlie Parker (cricketer) (1882–1959), English cricketer
Charlie Parker (footballer) (1891–1969), English footballer
Charlie Parker (Canadian football), American-born Canadian football player

Cultural figures
Charles Parker (producer) (1919–1980), BBC Radio producer of the Radio Ballads
Charlie Parker (1920–1955), jazz musician

Others
Sir Charles Parker, 5th Baronet (1792–1869), British naval officer
Charles Parker (VC) (1870–1918), English recipient of the Victoria Cross
Charles S. Parker (died 1950), American botanist
Charles Wolcott Parker (1862–1948), judge in New Jersey 
Charles Edward Parker, American architect from Boston, Massachusetts
Charles Wallace Parker, builder of the C. W. Parker Carousel

Characters
Charles Parker (detective), fictional character created by Dorothy L. Sayers
Charley Parker, DC Comics character Golden Eagle I
Charlie Parker, a fictional former police officer in a series of crime novels by John Connolly
Ensign Charles Parker, character in McHale's Navy

See also
Charles Parks (disambiguation)